The Kef Snoun mine is a large mine located in Tébessa Province, Algeria. Kef Snoun represents one of the largest phosphate reserves in the country, having estimated reserves of 520 million tonnes of ore grading 12% P2O5.

See also 
 List of mines in Algeria

References 

Phosphate mines in Algeria